The 2021–22 Mercer Bears women's basketball team represents Mercer University during the 2021–22 NCAA Division I women's basketball season. The Bears, led by twelfth-year head coach Susie Gardner, play their home games at the Hawkins Arena as members of the Southern Conference (SoCon). They finished the season 23–6, 13–1 in the Southern Conference, winning the regular season and tournament championships, and representing SoCon in the 2022 NCAA Division I women's basketball tournament.

Roster

Schedule

 
|-
!colspan=9 style=| Non-conference regular season

|-
!colspan=9 style=| SoCon regular season

|-
!colspan=9 style=| SoCon Tournament

|-
!colspan=9 style=| NCAA Tournament

References

Mercer Bears women's basketball seasons
Mercer
Mercer Bears
Mercer Bears
Mercer